The Australia national cricket team toured Zimbabwe in May 2004 to play a series of five One Day International (ODI) matches against Zimbabwe in Harare and Bulawayo.

Originally scheduled as a two-Test series to be held in April 2002. It was canceled by the Australian Cricket Board due to security reports received by them. Later, it was converted into an ODI series when ICC shutdown Test series due to Zimbabwe Board governance issues.

ODI series

1st ODI

2nd ODI

3rd ODI

4th ODI

5th ODI

References

2004 in Zimbabwean cricket
2004
International cricket competitions in 2004
Zimbabwean cricket seasons from 2000–01
2004 in Australian cricket